The Al-Muzaffar Mosque is a mosque reconstructed in Multan by the former prime minister of Pakistan, Yusuf Raza Gillani in 2011. It was constructed by multan famous businessman Al haji Khawaja Muzaffar ud-Din-sb near Multan Fort in 1955, near Ghanta Ghar (Multan).

History
It was built by late Khawaja Muzaffar Din s/o Khawaja Imam Bakhsh in 1955 on purchased land by him from Government auction and named Masjid Al Muzaffar.

See also
 Islam in Pakistan

External links
  Travel Multan 2012

2011 establishments in Pakistan
Mosques in Multan
Mosques completed in 2011